The Thai Permanent Representative in Geneva is the official representative of the Royal Thai Government to the United Nations Office at Geneva.

List of representatives

References 

 
United Nations Office at Geneva
Thailand
Thailand